is a 2015 Japanese animated youth school fantasy film produced by Studio Colorido and directed by Yōjirō Arai. It was released on June 5, 2015. Sentai Filmworks has licensed the film.

Plot
The film takes place at a school in Japan where a group of students and their teacher have to wait out a storm that is passing by. The protagonist Azuma has been fighting with his best friend Saijo and has a lot on his mind when he encounters a girl (Noruda) with a mysterious necklace. The girl seems to be in trouble and somehow connected to the storm. Azuma is taken over by a strong will to help this enchanting girl. Who is she and why is she in the middle of the storm? Can Azuma be any help to her? Why is his relationship with Saijo in such turmoil? The story combines little everyday problems and joys with an adventure that is out of this world.

Cast

References

External links
  
 

2010s animated short films
2015 fantasy films
2015 films
2015 anime films
Anime short films
Japanese animated fantasy films
Noitamina
Studio Colorido
School life in anime and manga
Sentai Filmworks
2015 directorial debut films
Films about weather hazards